Table Mountain, at  is the highest summit of the Monitor Range in south-central Nevada in the United States. The Table Mountain Wilderness is named after it.

See also
List of mountain peaks of Nevada

References

Mountains of Nevada
Mountains of Nye County, Nevada
North American 3000 m summits